Josef Dobrovský Monument is an outdoor monument commemorating Josef Dobrovský, installed at Kampa Park in Malá Strana, Prague, Czech Republic. It consists of a large base and a bust, which was designed by Tomáš Seidan in 1890. The monument was first revealed in Vrchlického sady near Prague main train station. After World War II, it was moved to the Kampa Park, next to Werichova vila, which is a house, where Dobrovský spent his pension.

References

External links

 

Busts in the Czech Republic
Malá Strana
Monuments and memorials in Prague
Outdoor sculptures in Prague
Sculptures of men in Prague